The 13 lane Business Bay Crossing (In Arabic: معبر الخليج التجاري; also known as the Ras Al Khor Bridge (جسر راس الخور)) is one of the most recent bridges across Dubai Creek and was opened to traffic in June 2007.  Six lanes travel from Deira to Bur Dubai while seven go from Bur Dubai to Deira.

The Business Bay Crossing is located some 1.5 km South of Al Garhoud Bridge near Dubai Festival City and  provides a new road corridor to motorists travelling between Bur Dubai and Deira and to Sharjah, in addition to Emirates Road and Sheikh Zayed Road.

The bridge cost 800 million dirhams and has a capacity of 26,000 vehicles per hour.

The bridge was built by BESIX, a company which made some major bridges in Dubai.

Photo gallery
Construction Photos on 31 January 2007

Construction Photos on 7 March 2007

Construction Photos from the air on 1 May 2007

Construction Photo on 31 May 2007

References

External links

 More information on the Business Bay Crossing

Bridges in the United Arab Emirates
Bridges completed in 2007
Transport in Dubai